Adrian Grainger Ford (January 1, 1904 – July 7, 1977) was a professional football player from Youngstown, Ohio. After going attending high school in Niles, Ohio; Ford attended and played college football for Lafayette College. He made his professional debut in the first American Football League, formed by Red Grange, in 1926 with the Philadelphia Quakers. He won the 1926 AFL Championship with the Quakers. After the AFL folded, the following year, Ford  moved to the National Football League. During his only year of playing in the league, Ford split the 1927 season between the Frankford Yellow Jackets and the Pottsville Maroons. He scored two touchdowns for Frankford during the season.

References

1904 births
1977 deaths
Players of American football from Youngstown, Ohio
Frankford Yellow Jackets players
Philadelphia Quakers (AFL) players
Pottsville Maroons players
Lafayette Leopards football players